Milan Kadlec (born 13 October 1974 in Uherské Hradiště, Czechoslovakia) is a Czech former racing cyclist, who competed both on the road and the track. In 2010, he won the bronze medal in the UCI Track Cycling World Championships points race.

Major results

1998
 1st Stage 1 Ytong Bohemia Tour
 2nd Road race, National Road Championships
1999
 1st Overall Giro della Valle d'Aosta
 1st Giro d'Oro
 1st GP Capodarco
 1st Stage 4 Ytong Bohemia Tour
 National Road Championships
2nd Road race
2nd Time trial
2000
 1st Stage 1 Ytong Bohemia Tour
 3rd Time trial, National Road Championships
2001
 1st Criterium d'Abruzzo
 1st Prologue Ytong Bohemia Tour
 2nd Overall Brixia Tour
 3rd Points race, UCI Track Cycling World Cup Classics, Szczecin
2002
 1st Overall Ytong Bohemia Tour
2004
 3rd Overall Ytong Bohemia Tour
 7th Trofeo Matteotti
2005
 3rd Time trial, National Road Championships
2006
 2nd Time trial, National Road Championships
2007
 1st  Points race, National Track Championships
 3rd Scratch, 2007–08 UCI Track Cycling World Cup Classics, Sydney
 4th Prague–Karlovy Vary–Prague
2008
 1st  Individual pursuit, National Track Championships
 8th Prague–Karlovy Vary–Prague
2009
 3rd Points race, 2008–09 UCI Track Cycling World Cup Classics, Ballerup
2010
 3rd Points race, UCI Track Cycling World Championships
 3rd Road race, National Road Championships
2011
 7th Overall Szlakiem Grodów Piastowskich
 10th Overall Tour of South Africa
 10th Overall Tour of Taihu Lake
2012
 1st  Road race, National Road Championships
 1st Overall Tour of Taihu Lake
1st Stage 1
 7th Overall Tour of Azerbaijan (Iran)
 9th Grand Prix Královéhradeckého kraje
 10th Overall Tour of Fuzhou
1st Stage 3
2013
 2nd Overall Tour of Iran
1st Stage 6
 2nd Overall Tour of Fuzhou
1st Mountains classification
2014
 2nd Overall Tour of China II
 4th Overall Tour of Fuzhou
 6th Overall Tour of Iran
1st Stage 3

External links

1974 births
Living people
Cyclists at the 2004 Summer Olympics
Cyclists at the 2008 Summer Olympics
Czech male cyclists
Olympic cyclists of the Czech Republic
People from Uherské Hradiště
Czech track cyclists
Tour of Azerbaijan (Iran) winners
Sportspeople from the Zlín Region